University Bridge is a concrete girder bridge that spans the Mississippi River in Saint Cloud, Minnesota. Built in 1985, and designed by Howard Needles Tammen & Bergendoff, it is the second-newest bridge in St. Cloud, after Granite City Crossing. It is named for its proximity to St. Cloud State University. To accommodate bikers and walkers, the bridge has an approach ramp on one side and steps on the other side. For decoration, a scrollwork pattern is cut into the approach walls' concrete, and the piers are a curved "V" shape.

The previous bridge at this structure, built in 1892, was a through-truss bridge.

See also
List of crossings of the Upper Mississippi River

References
 

Road bridges in Minnesota
Bridges over the Mississippi River
Buildings and structures in St. Cloud, Minnesota
Bridges completed in 1985
Transportation in Stearns County, Minnesota
Concrete bridges in the United States
Girder bridges in the United States